Atish Dabholkar (Marathi अतीश दाभोलकर) is an Indian theoretical physicist. He is currently the Director of the Abdus Salam International Centre for Theoretical Physics (ICTP)   with the rank of Assistant Director-General, UNESCO. Prior to that, he was head of ICTP's High Energy, Cosmology and Astroparticle Physics section, and also Directeur de Recherche at the Centre National de la Recherche Scientifique (CNRS) at Sorbonne University in the "Laboratoire de Physique Théorique et Hautes Énergies" (LPTHE).

Well known for his research on  string theory, black holes and quantum gravity, Dabholkar is an elected fellow
 of the Indian Academy of Sciences. The Council of Scientific and Industrial Research, the apex agency of India for scientific research, awarded him the Shanti Swarup Bhatnagar Prize for Science and Technology, the highest Indian science prize  awarded by the Prime Minister of India, for his contributions to physical sciences in 2006. Dabholkar  was awarded the Chaire d'Excellence of the Agence Nationale de la Recherche in France in 2007.  He is also a recipient of the National Leadership award from the President of India in 2008. In 2021, he was elected as a Fellow of The World Academy of Sciences (TWAS) for the advancement of science in developing countries.

Biography 
Atish Dabholkar earned his master's degree in physics from the Indian Institute of Technology, Kanpur in 1985 and his PhD in theoretical physics from Princeton University in 1990 under the guidance of Jeffrey A. Harvey. Subsequently, he worked at  Rutgers University and then at Harvard University  as a post-doctoral associate. After spending two years at California Institute of Technology as a senior research fellow, he returned to India in 1996 to take up the position of a professor of theoretical physics at Tata Institute of Fundamental Research till 2010. In November 2019, Dabholkar was appointed as Director of the Abdus Salam International Centre for Theoretical Physics (ICTP). Prior to that, he was head of ICTP's High Energy, Cosmology and Astroparticle Physics section International Centre for Theoretical Physics (ICTP) and a Directeur de Recherche of the Centre National de la Recherche Scientifique (CNRS) at Association Sorbonne Université  in the Laboratoire de Physique Théorique et Hautes Énergies (LPTHE) since 2007. Dabholkar was a visiting professor at Stanford University during 2003–04 and at CERN during 2012.

Contributions to Physics 

In his work in collaboration  with Jeffrey A. Harvey, Dabholkar identified a spectrum of supersymmetric states (now known as "Dabholkar-Harvey states'') 
and initiated the study of supersymmetric solitons in string theory
 which played an important role in the discovery  of duality symmetries in string theory and later in the study of quantum entropy of black holes. 
 
One of his important results concerns the computation of the quantum corrections to the Bekenstein Hawking entropy of a class of black holes in string theory. 
The Bhatnagar prize cites Dabholkar's "outstanding contributions for establishing how quantum theory modifies the entropy  of black holes and his pioneering studies of supersymmetric solitons in string theory".

Dabholkar collaborated with Sameer Murthy and Don Zagier to discover a connection  between the quantum entropy of black holes and the mathematics of mock modular forms 
 introduced by Ramanujan a century ago
. In his subsequent work with Pavel Putrov and Edward Witten he showed that mock modularity is generic and essential for exhibiting the duality symmetries of quantum gauge theories and M-theory.

Dabholkar was the co-organizer of the Strings 2001 Conference held at Tata Institute of Fundamental Research in Mumbai, India. 
A partial list of his publications is at  the online article repository of the Indian Academy of Sciences.

Family 
Atish Dabholkar is the son of Shripad Dabholkar and Vrinda Dabholkar and the nephew of Narendra Dabholkar. He is married to Anita Kovačič,  has two children, and lives in Slovenia.

Activism 

Dabholkar was one of the signatories to the letter by over 700 scientists against the Citizenship Amendment Bill.  The letter protested against the use of religion as a legal criterion for determining Indian citizenship as being fundamentally inconsistent with the basic structure of the constitution of India. 

Dabholkar participated in the movement of the Maharashtra Andhashraddha Nirmoolan Samiti to get the ‘’Anti Superstition Act’’ passed in the Maharashtra Legislature. He co-organized the signature campaign that collected the signatures of 3000 scientists and 100000 citizens in support. The law was successfully enacted in 2013.

Selected publications

Lecture Notes and Books

References

External links 

 
 
 
 

Recipients of the Shanti Swarup Bhatnagar Award in Physical Science
Indian scientific authors
Living people
Indian theoretical physicists
Fellows of the Indian Academy of Sciences
Indian string theorists
IIT Kanpur alumni
Princeton University alumni
Rutgers University alumni
Harvard University faculty
California Institute of Technology faculty
Stanford University faculty
Academic staff of Tata Institute of Fundamental Research
Year of birth missing (living people)
Research directors of the French National Centre for Scientific Research